Georg Marchl (born 22 January 1964) is an Austrian former wrestler who competed in the 1984 Summer Olympics.

References

External links
 

1964 births
Living people
Olympic wrestlers of Austria
Wrestlers at the 1984 Summer Olympics
Austrian male sport wrestlers
Wrestlers at the 2015 European Games
European Games competitors for Austria
20th-century Austrian people